Sir Edward Henry Charles Patrick Bellingham, 5th Baronet CMG, DSO, DL (26 January 1879 – 19 May 1956) was an Anglo-Irish soldier, politician, and diplomat.

Background and education
Bellingham was the eldest son of Sir Alan Henry Bellingham, 4th Baronet and his wife, Lady Constance Noel, the second daughter of Charles Noel, 2nd Earl of Gainsborough. He was educated at The Oratory School and went then to the Royal Military College, Sandhurst. In 1921, he succeeded his father as baronet.

Career
In 1899, Bellingham was commissioned as ensign into The Royal Scots He fought with his regiment in the Second Boer War and after short time was awarded the Queen's South Africa Medal. In 1902 he received the King's South Africa Medal together with three clasps. During the First World War Bellingham was wounded and mentioned in dispatches three times. He was decorated with the Distinguished Service Order in 1916 and was promoted to major in 1917, while serving as temporary brigadier-general. In the New Year's Honours 1918, he was appointed a Companion of the Order of St Michael and St George and a year later he was advanced to a brevet lieutenant-colonel. He retired in 1922.

Resident at Castlebellingham, County Louth, Bellingham was appointed Lord Lieutenant of Louth in 1921, a post he held for only one year until the establishment of the Irish Free State. In 1925, he was elected to the Free State Seanad Éireann with the ninth highest number of first preference votes nationwide of the 76 candidates, and he sat there until its abolition in 1936.

With the outbreak of World War II he joined the Royal Air Force. He was promoted to a flight officer in 1941 and later led a squadron. After the war he served in the Commission of Control in Germany until 1947. In his last years he was vice-consul at the British embassy in Guatemala.

Personal life
Bellingham was a breeder of pedigree pigs and Aberdeen Angus cattle. On 11 June 1904, he married Charlotte Elizabeth; she was the daughter of Alfred Payne and widow of Frederick Gough. They had an only daughter. Bellingham died in 1956 and was survived by his wife, who died in 1964. He was succeeded in the baronetcy by his nephew, Roger.

Notes

References

External links

1879 births
1956 deaths
British Army brigadiers
Royal Air Force personnel of World War II
Politicians from County Louth
Baronets in the Baronetage of Great Britain
Alumni of Oratorian schools
British Army personnel of the Second Boer War
British Army generals of World War I
Companions of the Distinguished Service Order
Companions of the Order of St Michael and St George
Lord-Lieutenants of Louth
Members of the 1925 Seanad
Members of the 1928 Seanad
Members of the 1931 Seanad
Members of the 1934 Seanad
Royal Air Force officers
Graduates of the Royal Military College, Sandhurst
Independent members of Seanad Éireann
People from Castlebellingham